Mithapur Solar Power Plant is a 25 MW solar power plant located in Mithapur, Gujarat. It is expected to produce 40,734 MWh/year. 108,696 230 Wp panels were used.

Features
The panels are of polycrystalline silicon photovoltaic technology.

Finance
The developer of the solar power plant, private power company Tata Power Ltd., obtained the funding for the project, estimated to be Rs. 365 crores, through a debt equity ratio of 70:30. The funding consists of Rs. 110 crores of equity and Rs. 255 crores of rupee term loan. Tata power signed a power purchase agreement with Gujarat Urja Vikas Nigam Ltd. The tariff received is Rs 15/kWh for the first 12 years and 5 Rs thereafter.

Commissioning
The power plant was commissioned on 25 January 2012.

Production

See also

 Gujarat Solar Park
 Solar power in India

References

Photovoltaic power stations in India
Solar power stations in Gujarat
Jamnagar district
Energy infrastructure completed in 2012
2012 establishments in Gujarat